Lubomyr Yaroslav Luciuk (born July 9, 1953) is a Canadian academic and author of books and articles in the field of political geography and Ukrainian history. He is currently a full professor at the Royal Military College of Canada.

Background and education 

Luciuk was born and raised in Kingston, Ontario. He earned two degrees from Queen's University, an Honours BSc (1976) and MA (1979) and completed his PhD (1984) at the University of Alberta. He had postdoctoral fellowships at the University of Toronto and Queen's University.

Political and academic work 
Luciuk served as a part-time Member of the Parole Board of Canada from 2013 to April 2016.

He is currently a full professor of Political Geography in the Department of Political Science and Economics at the Royal Military College of Canada, in Kingston.

Awards 
In 2010, Luciuk was one of 16 recipients of the Shevchenko Medal of the Ukrainian Canadian Congress in recognition of his educational, research and advocacy efforts on behalf of the Ukrainian Canadian community. On 6 December 2019 he received the Cross of Ivan Mazepa, a Ukrainian Presidential Award, presented in Kingston by His Excellency, Andriy Shevchenko, Ukraine's Ambassador to Canada. More recently he was declared a persona non grata by the Russian Federation.

Publications 
Professor Luciuk specializes in the political geography of Eastern Europe and the former Soviet Union, refugee studies, and the ethnic and immigration history of Canada. He is the author or editor/co-editor of 31 publications including "In Fear of the Barbed Wire Fence: Canada's First National Internment Operations", "Searching for Place: Ukrainian Displaced Persons, Canada, and Migration of Memory", and "Konowal: A Canadian Hero", and over 200 editorials in Canadian newspapers.

Luciuk also established Kashtan Press, a publisher of books on Ukraine.

Books authored/edited/compiled by Luciuk 
 "Enemy Archives: Soviet Counterinsurgency Operations and the Ukrainian Nationalist Movement," McGill-Queen's University Press, 2023 (co-edited with Volodymyr Viatrovych).
"Operation Payback: Soviet Disinformation and Alleged Nazi War Criminals in North America," The Kashtan Press, 2022.
"A few words about my life: The Recollections of Rev Dr J C E Riotte," Kashtan Press, 2021
"Famines in European Economic History: The last great European famines reconsidered," 2015, Routledge, 2015 (with D Curran and A G Newby, co-eds)
 
 "Ukrainians in the Making: Their Kingston Story," The Limestone Press, 1980
 "A Delicate and Difficult Question: Documents in the History of Ukrainians in Canada, 1899–1962," The Limestone Press, 1986 with B. S. Kordan
 "Anglo-American Perspectives on the Ukrainian Question, 1938–1951," The Limestone Press, 1987, with B. S. Kordan
 "Canada's Ukrainians: Negotiating an Identity," University of Toronto Press, 1991 (with Stella Hryniuk).
 Searching for Place: Ukrainian Displaced Persons, Canada and the Migration of Memory (University of Toronto Press, 2000)
 Creating a Landscape: A Geography of Ukrainians in Canada (University of Toronto Press, 1989), with B. S. Kordan
 "In Fear of the Barbed Wire Fence: Canada's First National Internment Operations and the Ukrainian Canadians, 1914–1920," Kashtan Press, 2001.
 A Time for Atonement: Canada's First National Internment Operations, 1914–1920 (Kingston, Ontario: Limestone Press, 1988)
 Their Just War: Images of the Ukrainian Insurgent Army (Kingston, Ont: Kashtan Press, 2007) with Wasyl Humeniuk
 The Foreign Office and the Famine: British Documents on Ukraine and the Great Famine of 1932–1933 (Kingston, Ontario: Limestone Press, 1988), with M Carynnyk & B S Kordan (co eds)
 "Righting an Injustice: The Debate over Redress for Canada's First National Internment Operations," Justinian Press, 1994
 Holodomor: Reflections on the Great Famine of 1932–1933 in Soviet Ukraine (Kingston, Ontario: Kashtan Press, 2008)
 The Holy See and the Holodomor: Documents from the Vatican Secret Archives on the Great Famine of 1932–1933 in Soviet Ukraine, with Athanasius McVay (University of Toronto, Chair of Ukrainian Studies & Kashtan Press, 2011)
 "Jews, Ukrainians, and the Euromaidan," (Chair of Ukrainian Studies in association with the Kashtan Press, 2014).
 "Tell Them We Are Starving: The 1933 Dairies of Gareth Joenes," (Kashtan Press, 2016)
 ' How People Live in Soviet Russia," by Mendel Osherowitch (Chair of Ukrainian Studies in association with the Kashtan Press, 2020)

References

External links 
 www.uccla.ca (Ukrainian Canadian Civil Liberties Association)

Living people
20th-century Canadian historians
Canadian male non-fiction writers
Canadian people of Ukrainian descent
Academic staff of the Royal Military College of Canada
Writers from Kingston, Ontario
1953 births
Recipients of the Cross of Ivan Mazepa
Historians of Ukraine